Baldwin V ( 1012 – 1 September 1067) was Count of Flanders from 1035 until his death. He secured the personal union between the counties of Flanders and Hainaut and maintained close links to the Anglo-Saxon monarchy, which was overthrown by his son-in-law, William the Conqueror, near the end of his life.

Family

Baldwin was born into the House of Flanders, the son of Baldwin IV of Flanders and Ogive of Luxembourg. Baldwin married Adela, daughter of King Robert II of France, in 1028 in Amiens; at her instigation he rebelled against his father but in 1030 peace was sworn and the old count continued to rule until his death.
The couple had three children: Baldwin VI (1030–1070), Matilda ( 1031–1083), who was married to William the Conqueror, and Robert I ( 1033–1093).

Career
During a long war (1046–1056) as an ally of Duke Godfrey III of Lower Lorraine against Emperor Henry III, Baldwin initially lost Valenciennes to Count Herman of Mons. However, when the latter died in 1049, Baldwin had his son, Baldwin VI, marry Herman's widow Richilde, and arranged that the children of her first marriage were disinherited, thus de facto uniting the County of Hainaut with Flanders. Upon the death of Henry III this marriage was acknowledged by treaty by Agnes of Poitou, mother and regent of Henry IV.

Baldwin V played host to a grateful Emma of Normandy, the exiled queen dowager of England, at Bruges. He supplied armed security guards, entertainment, comprising a band of minstrels. Bruges was a bustling commercial centre, and Emma fittingly grateful to the citizens. She dispensed generously to the poor, making contact with the monastery of Saint Bertin at St Omer, and received her son King Harthacnut of England at Bruges in 1039.

From 1060 to 1067 Baldwin was the co-regent with Anne of Kiev for his nephew Philip I of France, indicating the importance he had acquired in international politics. As count of Flanders, Baldwin supported the king of France in most affairs, but he was also father-in-law to Duke William II of Normandy, who had married his daughter Matilda. Flanders played a pivotal role in Edward the Confessor's foreign policy when the king of England was struggling to find an heir. Historians have argued that he may have sent Harold Godwinson to negotiate the return of Edward the Exile from Hungary, and passed through Flanders, on his way to Germany. Baldwin's half-sister had married Earl Godwin's third son, Tostig. The half-Danish Godwinsons had spent their exile in Dublin, at a time William II of Normandy was fiercely defending his duchy. It is unlikely, however, that Baldwin intervened to prevent the duke's invasion plans of England, after the count had lost the conquered province of Ponthieu. Baldwin died 1 September 1067.

References

Bibliography
 Frans J. Van Droogenbroeck, De markenruil Ename – Valenciennes en de investituur van de graaf van Vlaanderen in de mark Ename, Handelingen van de Geschied- en Oudheidkundige Kring van Oudenaarde 55 (2018) S. 47-127

House of Flanders
Baldwin 5
Margraves of Valenciennes
Flanders, Baldwin V of
Flanders, Baldwin V of
Flanders, Baldwin V of

Flanders, Baldwin V of